Larry Townsend (27 October 1930 – 29 July 2008) was the American author of dozens of books including Run, Little Leather Boy (1970) and The Leatherman's Handbook (1972), published by pioneer erotic presses such as Greenleaf Classics and the Other Traveler imprint of Olympia Press. Leatherman's Handbook, with illustrations by Sean, was among the first books to popularize BDSM among the general public.

Biography
Born Michael Lawrence Townsend, he grew up as a teenager in Los Angeles, where his neighbors included Noël Coward, Irene Dunne, and Laura Hope Crews. He attended the Peddie School and was stationed as Staff Sergeant in charge of NCOIC Operations of Air Intelligence Squadrons from 1950 through 1954 with the United States Air Force in Germany. Completing his tour of duty, he entered into the small, underground LA leather scene where he and Montgomery Clift shared a lover.

With his degree in industrial psychology from UCLA (1957), he worked in the private sector and as a probation officer with the Forestry Service. He began his pioneering activism in the politics of homophile liberation in the early 1960s. During this time he met Fred Yerkes (August 27, 1935 - July 8, 2006), who would become his companion of 43 years.

In 1972, as president of the 'Homophile Effort for Legal Protection' which had been founded in 1969 to defend gays during and after arrests, he led a group in founding the H.E.L.P. Newsletter, the forebear of Drummer Magazine (1975). He lived in the Silver Lake neighborhood of Los Angeles, the center of the Los Angeles leather scene (the equivalent of the SoMa neighborhood in San Francisco). As a writer and photographer, he was an essential eyewitness of the drama and salon around Drummer, which often excerpted his novels. Townsend's signature "Leather Notebook" column appeared in Drummer for twelve years beginning in 1980, and continued in Honcho to 2008. His last novel, TimeMasters, was published April 2008. His last writing was Who Lit up the Lit of the Golden Age of Drummer an introduction to Gay San Francisco: Eyewitness Drummer (June 2008).

Honors
In 1995 Townsend received the Steve Maidhof Award for National or International Work from the National Leather Association International.

In 2002 Townsend received the Forebear Award as part of the Pantheon of Leather Awards.

In 2016 Townsend was inducted into the Leather Hall of Fame.

References

External links
 Spill a Drop for Lost Brothers: Larry Townsend, author, The Leatherman's Handbook, by Jack Fritscher. (This article won the 2009 National Leather Association International’s Cynthia Slater Non-Fiction Article Award)
 Who Lit up the "Lit" of the Golden Age of Drummer
 Leather Dolce Vita, Pop Culture, & the Prime of Mr. Larry Townsend
 Los Angeles Times obituary
 Larry Townsend Collection (MS 1975). Manuscripts and Archives, Yale University Library.

1930 births
2008 deaths
BDSM writers
American gay writers
Leather subculture
LGBT people from California
Peddie School alumni
20th-century American LGBT people